Jung Sang-Hoon  (Hangul: 정상훈; born 22 March 1985) is a South Korean football player. He has played for K-League side Gyeongnam FC during 1 season and Busan Kyotong in the Korean second division.

References

External links 

1987 births
Living people
South Korean footballers
Gyeongnam FC players
K League 1 players
Korea National League players
Association football midfielders